Body Rock is a 1984 American dance film directed by Marcelo Epstein. Lorenzo Lamas stars as Chilly, a young man "from the streets" with a talent for break-dancing.

The film received negative reviews from critics and was a failure at the box office.

Lamas was nominated for Worst Actor at the 5th Golden Raspberry Awards for his performance, but lost to Sylvester Stallone in Rhinestone. Also nominated was the song "Smooth Talker"—one of two songs in the film performed by Lamas. The other, "Fools Like Me", remains Lamas's one single to date to crack the Billboard Hot 100 chart; it peaked at number 85 in January 1985.

In his book The Official Razzie Movie Guide, John J. B. Wilson, founder of the Golden Raspberry Awards, listed the film  as one of The 100 Most Enjoyably Bad Movies Ever Made.

The soundtrack also features Laura Branigan, Roberta Flack and others including Ashford & Simpson. The theme song "Body Rock", performed by Maria Vidal, peaked at number 48 on the Hot 100 in October 1984 and reached number eight on the US dance charts. A year later, in the autumn of 1985, "Body Rock" reached number 11 in the UK.

Plot
Chilly is just a guy from the streets with a talent for break-dancing. When his wicked moves catch the eye of an industry pro, Chilly finds his dreams of fame and fortune coming true, for better or for worse.

Cast
 Lorenzo Lamas as "Chilly"
 Vicki Frederick as Claire
 Cameron Dye as "E-Z"
 Michelle Nicastro as Darlene
 Ray Sharkey as Terrence
 Seth Kaufman as Jama
 Rene Elizondo as "Snake"

References

External links

 

1984 films
1984 drama films
1984 independent films
1980s dance films
1980s musical drama films
American dance films
American independent films
American musical drama films
1980s English-language films
Films scored by Sylvester Levay
New World Pictures films
1980s American films